Darya Stepanyuk (also Daria Stepaniuk, born 22 May 1990 in Kharkiv, Ukraine) is a Ukrainian swimmer.

After finishing college, Stepanyuk entered KNAPK as part of the cycle sport faculty.

Stepanyuk has broken several Ukrainian swimming records, and took part in the 2008 Olympic Games. Today she trains and works at Akvarena swimming pool in Kharkiv, and participates in various Ukrainian, European and world competitions.

During the 2009 Summer Universiade, Stepanyuk won gold medal in 100 m freestyle. The same year, she also participated at the Ukrainian Cup at which she won a gold medal in 100 m freestyle which was her second win at UC.

She competed in the 50 m freestyle and  freestyle at the 2012 Summer Olympics.

As a representative of Dynamo Kharkiv, Darya Stepanyuk won silver medal in 50 m freestyle in 2015.

She again competed at the Olympics in 2016, competing in the 50 m freestyle and the 100 m butterfly events.

See also
Swimming at the 2008 Summer Olympics – Women's 100 metre freestyle

References

External links

Чемпионат Украины по плаванию. Степанюк выиграла 100-метровку вольным стилем, atn.kharkov.ua 
Сергей Бондар: «Олимпийская сборная по плаванию образца 2012 года – это молодежь плюс Борисик», sport.glavred.info 
В Харькове пловцы установили три рекорда Украины, tochka.net 
Дарья Степанюк установила национальный рекорд на КУ по плаванию, mykharkov.com.ua 
Результаты Универсиады 2009, krystal.org.ua 

1990 births
Living people
Sportspeople from Kharkiv
Ukrainian female swimmers
Olympic swimmers of Ukraine
Swimmers at the 2008 Summer Olympics
Swimmers at the 2012 Summer Olympics
Swimmers at the 2016 Summer Olympics
Universiade medalists in swimming
Universiade silver medalists for Ukraine
Medalists at the 2011 Summer Universiade
21st-century Ukrainian women